The Samar squirrel (Sundasciurus samarensis) is a species of rodent in the family Sciuridae. It was historically known as lalagsing. It is endemic to the Philippines, where it has been recorded from Samar and Leyte Islands. Its natural habitat is subtropical or tropical dry forests. It is threatened by habitat loss, due to expanding human activities, hunting, and the lack of basic knowledge about the species. They thrive in primary and secondary lowland and montane forest, including the lower edges of mossy forest. It is also found in some agricultural areas.

References

Thorington, R. W. Jr. and R. S. Hoffman. 2005. Family Sciuridae. pp. 754–818 in Mammal Species of the World a Taxonomic and Geographic Reference. D. E. Wilson and D. M. Reeder eds. Johns Hopkins University Press, Baltimore.
Chiosa, F. 2016. Sundasciurus samarensis. The IUCN Red List of Threatened Species 2016.

Sundasciurus
Rodents of the Philippines
Mammals described in 1890
Endemic fauna of the Philippines
Fauna of Samar
Taxa named by Joseph Beal Steere
Taxonomy articles created by Polbot